Christopher John Chittell  (born 19 May 1948) is an English actor, known for his role as Eric Pollard in the ITV soap opera Emmerdale. He has portrayed the role since 1986, making him the longest-serving cast member in the soap's history.

Biography

Early life
Chittell was born in Aldershot, Hampshire. His father served in the Indian Army, and on leaving school Chittell intended to join the Royal Navy, but instead, he became a model. His first acting stint was in 1964, with the National Theatre, at Chichester Festival Theatre, in Peter Shaffer's The Royal Hunt of the Sun.

Career
He appeared as Potter in the 1967 film To Sir, with Love. In 1968 he appeared as a Trooper in The Charge of the Light Brigade, and made an uncredited appearance in If.... . This was followed by a starring role as one of the Freewheelers, made as an action/adventure children's serial by Southern Television between 1968 and 1973. 

Chittal acted for two seasons in the 1970s science fiction TV drama The Tomorrow People. His other film appearances included roles in The Beast in the Cellar (1970), The Weekend Murders (1971), The Raging Moon (1971), The Last Valley (1971), Erotic Inferno (1975), Golden Rendezvous (1977), Zulu Dawn (1979) and Game for Vultures (1979). He also appeared in a number of Swedish sex films in the 1970s including Swedish Sex Games (aka The Intruders and Let Us Play Sex) in 1975 (which also featured a young Stellan Skarsgård).

He performed on stage at the Old Vic in Macbeth with Peter O'Toole. In 1972, Chittell appeared in the untransmitted Doomwatch episode "Sex and Violence", playing Dick Burns, widely believed to be a parody of Cliff Richard and Richard's part in the Nationwide Festival of Light. The "Sex and Violence" episode was included as part of the Doomwatch DVD box set release in April 2016.

Personal life
Chittell is married to his Emmerdale co-star Lesley Dunlop, who plays Brenda Walker.

Honours
He was awarded the British Empire Medal (BEM) in the 2019 Queen's Birthday Honours List for services to drama and charity.

Filmography

References

External links
 

English male soap opera actors
English male film actors
English male stage actors
1948 births
Living people
Actors from Aldershot
Recipients of the British Empire Medal